Eric Neumann-Aubichon (born September 20, 1984) is a Canadian ice dancer. He represented Greece internationally with Christa-Elizabeth Goulakos. They were coached by Chantal Lefebvre and Arseni Markov. Goulakos and Neumann-Aubichon represented Greece at the European Figure Skating Championships and the World Figure Skating Championships. Neumann-Aubichon previously skated with Alice Graham. Neumann-Aubichon is born in Montreal, Quebec, Canada.

References

External links
 

1984 births
Canadian male ice dancers
Living people
Greek male ice dancers
Figure skaters from Montreal